Lieutenant General Sir Edward Thomas Humphreys  (5 November 1878 – 
15 January 1955) was a British Army officer who commanded 5th Division.

Early life and education
Humphreys was born in Dover, Kent, the son of Thomas Humphreys and Jeannette Napoli Cotman. He was educated at Charterhouse School and the Royal Military College, Sandhurst.

Military career
Humphreys was commissioned into the Lancashire Fusiliers as a second lieutenant on 7 May 1898, and was promoted to lieutenant on 1 April 1899. He served in the 2nd Battalion, which was posted to South Africa in December 1899 after the outbreak of the Second Boer War. In South Africa he was Adjutant of the Mounted Infantry Battalion, and was promoted to captain on 5 October 1901. Humphreys served in South Africa throughout the war, which formally ended in June 1902 after the Peace of Vereeniging, and returned to the posting as regular officer in the 2nd battalion of his regiment in late September 1902. He joined other officers and men of the battalion who left Cape Town on the SS Britannic in October that year, and was stationed at Aldershot after their return.

He served in World War I in France and then with the Egyptian Expeditionary Force latterly as a Brigade Commander. After the War he became a Commander of the 7th Indian Infantry Brigade before being appointed deputy director of Military Operations and Intelligence at the War Office in 1925. He went on to be Commandant of the Staff College, Quetta, in India in 1928 and General Officer Commanding 5th Division in 1931 before retiring in 1937.

References

|-

1878 births
1955 deaths
People educated at Charterhouse School
Graduates of the Royal Military College, Sandhurst
British Army lieutenant generals
Knights Commander of the Order of the Bath
Companions of the Order of St Michael and St George
Companions of the Distinguished Service Order
Lancashire Fusiliers officers
British Army personnel of the Second Boer War
Commandants of the Staff College, Quetta
Military personnel from Kent
British Army generals of World War I